Clear Lake may refer to:

Inhabited places

Canada
Clear Lake, Ontario (disambiguation)
Wasagaming, Manitoba, also known as Clear Lake

United States
Clear Lake, Illinois
Clear Lake, Indiana
Clear Lake, Iowa
Clear Lake, Minnesota
Clear Lake, Oregon
Clear Lake, South Dakota, city in Deuel County
Clear Lake, Marshall County, South Dakota, census-designated place
Clear Lake, Texas, in Collin County
Clear Lake (region), near Galveston Bay, Texas
Clear Lake City (Greater Houston), Texas
Clear Lake, Pierce County, Washington
Clear Lake, Skagit County, Washington
Clear Lake, Wisconsin
Clear Lake (town), Wisconsin
Clear Lake Shores, Texas, in Galveston County
Clear Lake Township (disambiguation)

Lakes

United States

Clear Lake (California)
Clear Lake (Orlando, Florida)
Clear Lake (Iowa)
Clear Lake (Maine)
Clear Lake (Michigan), an index of lakes in Michigan named Clear Lake
Clear Lake (Meeker County, Minnesota)
Clear Lake (New York)
Clear Lake (Herkimer County, New York)
Clear Lake (Oregon), several lakes, including:
Clear Lake (Douglas County, Oregon)
Clear Lake (Linn County, Oregon)
Clear Lake (Wasco County, Oregon)
Clear Lake (Deuel County, South Dakota)
Clear Lake (Hamlin County, South Dakota)
Clear Lake (Marshall County, South Dakota)
Clear Lake (Minnehaha County, South Dakota)
Clear Lake (Galveston Bay), a lake near Houston, Texas
Clear Lake (Thurston County, Washington)
Clear Lake, formed by Clear Creek Dam (Washington), in Yakima County
Clear Lake Reservoir, Modoc County, California

Lakes in other places
Clear Lake (Ross Island), Antarctica
Clear Lake (Canada), several lakes in Canada with this name 
Clear Lake (Palau)

Other uses
Clear Lake AVA, a wine region in Lake County, California

See also
Clearlake (disambiguation)